Dednik is a small settlement below Dednik Hill on the Rute Plateau in the hills west of Velike Lašče in central Slovenia. The area is part of the traditional region of Lower Carniola and is now included in the Central Slovenia Statistical Region.

References

External links
Dednik on Geopedia

Populated places in the Municipality of Velike Lašče